Matti Ilmari Jutila (born 1943) is a mathematician and a professor emeritus at the University of Turku. He researches in the field of analytic number theory.

Education and career

Jutila's work has repeatedly succeeded in lowering the upper bound for Linnik's constant. He is the author of a monograph, Lectures on a method in the theory of exponential sums (1987).  He has been a member of the Finnish Academy of Science and Letters since 1982.

References

External links

1943 births
Living people
Finnish mathematicians
Number theorists
Members of the Finnish Academy of Science and Letters